Manuel Bölstler (born 26 April 1983) is a German former professional footballer who played as a defensive midfielder.

References

External links
 
 
 
 Manuel Bölstler at Voetbal International 

1983 births
Living people
Sportspeople from Tübingen
German footballers
Footballers from Baden-Württemberg
Association football midfielders
2. Bundesliga players
3. Liga players
Regionalliga players
Eerste Divisie players
Liga Leumit players
VfB Stuttgart II players
SC Cambuur players
SV Darmstadt 98 players
Wuppertaler SV players
Rot Weiss Ahlen players
Rot-Weiss Essen players
FC Rot-Weiß Erfurt players
Arminia Bielefeld players
Hapoel Kfar Saba F.C. players
Karlsruher SC players
FC Gütersloh 2000 players
SC Westfalia Herne players
German expatriate footballers
German expatriate sportspeople in the Netherlands
Expatriate footballers in the Netherlands
German expatriate sportspeople in Israel
Expatriate footballers in Israel